Realistic silicone masks have been used in crimes throughout the world. In China, criminals can obtain silicone masks cheaply from the internet and have used them for criminal activities. Silicone masks have been used as a disguise to conceal identity to perpetrate crimes.

Incidents

See also
Anti-mask law
Police impersonation
Ghostface (identity)
Guy Fawkes mask

References

Silicone mask
Masks in law
Silicone mask
Silicon